Spermolepis is a genus of flowering plants belonging to the family Apiaceae.

Its native range is Hawaiian Islands, USA to Mexico, Argentina.

Species:
     
Spermolepis castellanosii 
Spermolepis diffusa 
Spermolepis divaricata 
Spermolepis echinata 
Spermolepis gigantea 
Spermolepis hawaiiensis 
Spermolepis inermis 
Spermolepis infernensis 
Spermolepis laevis 
Spermolepis lateriflora 
Spermolepis organensis

References

Apioideae
Apioideae genera